Hans Denissen (born 9 March 1984) is a Dutch former professional footballer. He ended his career in 2019, playing indoor soccer for Major Arena Soccer League side Milwaukee Wave.

Club career

Europe
Denissen started his career with amateur side SvSSS from Udenhout. There, he was discovered by hometown club, Willem II. After going through their youth department, he was promoted to the first team squad in the summer of 2003.

After his first three years, he signed with RBC Roosendaal. The following season, he joined MVV, and it looked like he would spend his career in the second division of Dutch league football. Surprisingly, he transferred to Cypriot side Ayia Napa FC in the summer of 2008. The following season, he moved to Finland and joined FC Haka. After only a few months, he found his way back to his home country and to the second division, as he joined FC Emmen.

In the summer of 2011 he rejoined former team Willem II on an amateur contract to play in the second team.

United States
Denissen signed with San Antonio Scorpions FC of the North American Soccer League on 9 January 2012. During the 2013 regular season, he made 25 appearances and was named to the NASL Best XI.

The New York Cosmos signed Denissen on 2 January 2014. Denissen made his Cosmos' debut on 28 May 2014, coming on as a second-half substitute in the team's 2–0 win over the Brooklyn Italians in the U.S. Open Cup. Denissen appeared in his first NASL game for the Cosmos on 8 June 2014, coming in as a substitute in the 74th minute of the team's 1–0 win over Ottawa Fury FC. He returned to San Antonio to face his former club for the first time on 1 November 2014, coming on as a substitute in the 68th minute of the team's 1–0 road loss. Just one week later, he came on as a substitute again in extra time of the team's 2–1 semifinal loss in San Antonio against a Scorpions side that would go on to win The Championship. Denissen made five starts in 11 regular season appearances for the Cosmos in 2014 and was tied for second on the team with three assists.

After his release from New York Cosmos, Denissen signed with Atlanta Silverbacks in February 2015.

Denissen retired in 2019, playing indoor soccer for Major Arena Soccer League side Milwaukee Wave. He continued in a role as assistant coach of the team.

International
In 2005, he was a substitute in an official friendly match for the Netherlands national under-21 football team.

References

1984 births
Living people
Footballers from Tilburg
Dutch footballers
Netherlands under-21 international footballers
Association football forwards
Willem II (football club) players
RBC Roosendaal players
MVV Maastricht players
Ayia Napa FC players
FC Haka players
FC Emmen players
San Antonio Scorpions players
New York Cosmos (2010) players
Atlanta Silverbacks players
Milwaukee Wave players
Dutch expatriate footballers
Dutch expatriate sportspeople in Cyprus
Expatriate footballers in Cyprus
Dutch expatriate sportspeople in Finland
Expatriate footballers in Finland
Dutch expatriate sportspeople in the United States
Expatriate soccer players in the United States
Eredivisie players
Eerste Divisie players
Veikkausliiga players
Cypriot Second Division players
North American Soccer League players
Major Arena Soccer League players